Roy Clifton Strickland (September 20, 1942 – September 22, 2010) was a businessman in The Woodlands, Texas, north of Houston, who was a pioneer in the development of the Republican Party in the U.S. state of Louisiana. Strickland challenged the Democrat Gillis William Long, a part of the Long political dynasty, for the United States House of Representatives in 1972. More than a decade later, he ran unsuccessfully for local office as a write-in candidate in Texas.

References

External links
 http://www.roystrickland.com/
 http://www.businessweek.com/magazine/content/01_29/b3741618.htm
 http://www.roystrickland.com/ourteam.html

1942 births
2010 deaths
American real estate businesspeople
Louisiana Republicans
Texas Republicans
People from Houston
Politicians from Vicksburg, Mississippi
People from Gonzales, Louisiana
United States Navy sailors
People from The Woodlands, Texas